New Orpheum Theatre or New Orpheum Theater may refer to:
Orpheum Theatre (Champaign, Illinois), also known as "The New Orpheum", listed on the NRHP in Illinois
New Orpheum Theatre (Sioux City, Iowa), listed on the NRHP in Iowa

See also
Orpheum (disambiguation)